Gumbazy (Gömbaźı) is a rural locality (a village) in Sterlibashevsky Selsoviet, Sterlibashevsky District, Bashkortostan, Russia. The population was 27 as of 2010. There is 1 street.

Geography 
Gumbazy is located 4 km southeast of Sterlibashevo (the district's administrative centre) by road. Sterlibashevo is the nearest rural locality.

References 

Rural localities in Sterlibashevsky District